A frame is often a structural system that supports other components of a physical construction and/or steel frame that limits the construction's extent.

Frame and FRAME may also refer to:

Physical objects

In building construction
Framing (construction), a building term known as light frame construction
Framer, a carpenter who assembles major structural elements in constructing a building
A-frame, a basic structure designed to bear a load in a lightweight economical manner
A-frame house, a house following the same principle
Door frame or window frame, fixed structures to which the hinges of doors or windows are attached
Frame and panel, a method of woodworking
Space frame, a method of construction using lightweight or light materials
Timber framing, a method of building for creating framed structures of heavy timber or willow wood

In vehicles
Frame (aircraft), structural rings in an aircraft fuselage
Frame (nautical), the skeleton of a boat 
Bicycle frame, the main component of a bicycle, onto which other components are fitted
Motorcycle frame, main component of a motorbike, onto which other components are fitted
Locomotive frame, a structure that forms the backbone of a railway locomotive
Vehicle frame, to which everything on an automobile is mounted

Other physical objects
Frame (loudspeaker) or basket, a structural component which supports the functional components of a loudspeaker
Bed frame, the part of a bed used to position the mattress and base
Climbing frame or jungle gym, a piece of equipment for children's play
Eyeglass frame
Lever frame, a railway signalling device containing interlocks for signals, points (railroad switches) etc.
Picture frame, a solid border around a picture or painting
Receiver (firearms) or frame, one of the basic parts of a modern firearm
Spinning frame, an invention of the Industrial Revolution for spinning thread or yarn from fibre such as wool or cotton
Water frame, a water-powered spinning frame which was an easy way to create cotton
Frame (beekeeping), a wooden frame designed to hold an area of honeycomb in a Langstroth-type beehive

Mathematics and physics 
Basis, an ordered basis is also called a "frame"
Frame bundle, in mathematics is a principal fiber bundle associated with any vector bundle
Frame (linear algebra), a generalization of a basis to sets of possibly linearly dependent vectors which also satisfy the frame condition
Frames and locales, in order theory
k-frame, a generalization of a basis to linearly independent sets of vectors that need not span the space
Moving frame, in differential geometry
Orthonormal frame, in Riemannian geometry
Projective frame, in projective geometry
Sampling frame, a set of items or events possible to measure (statistics)
Frame of reference, in physics, an abstract coordinate system together with a set of physical reference points

Computing and telecommunications

In displays
Frame (GUI), a box used to hold other widgets in a graphical user interface
Film frame, one of the many single photographic images in a motion picture
Frame rate, the number of frames—or images—displayed on screen per unit of time, usually expressed in frames per second (FPS)
Framing (World Wide Web), a method of displaying multiple HTML documents on one page of a web browser
Iframes, a frame element in HTML code

Software
Adobe FrameMaker, a desktop publishing application
Google Chrome Frame, an open source plug-in designed for Internet Explorer
Software framework

Other uses in computing and telecommunications
Frame (artificial intelligence), machine-usable formalizations of concepts or schemata that can be used for knowledge representation
Frame (networking), a data transmission unit or network packet that includes frame synchronization information
Distribution frame, in telecommunications
Mainframe computer
Page frame, an available chunk of memory
Stack frame, a part of a call stack
A data structure in frame languages
Frame problem, in artificial intelligence
Framing, the application of networking frames using frame synchronization
Frame technology (software engineering), a models-to-code system based on adaptable frames

Other sciences
Filters, random fields, and maximum entropy model (FRAME), in physics and probability
Fund for the Replacement of Animals in Medical Experiments
Frame Overo, a coat pattern in horses
Hive frame, a structural element that holds honeycomb
Reading frame, which divides a sequence of nucleotides into a set of consecutive, non-overlapping triplets
Frameshift mutation, when a single base-pair is added to a DNA string, causing incorrect transcription
Frame analysis, a social science research method used to analyze how people understand situations and activities
FRAMES, methods of brief intervention against alcohol misuse
Framing (social sciences), in communication theory and sociology, relating to the contextual presentation of media content

Arts and media

Film and television
 "Frame" (Law & Order: Criminal Intent), a 2008 episode of the TV series Law & Order: Criminal Intent
 The Frame (film), a 2014 American science fiction film
 Frames Production, an Indian multifaceted production company

Literature
Frame story, a narrative technique, for telling stories within a story
Frame (literary journal), a literary journal from the Netherlands
Frame (design magazine), a design magazine from the Netherlands
Frame (1971–1990), a book of collected poetry by Barrett Watten, published in 1997

Music
The Frames, an Irish band
Frames (Oceansize album), a 2007 album by Oceansize
Frames (Leee DeWyze album), a 2013 album by Leee DeWyze

Visual arts
 The Frame (painting), by Frida Kahlo

Other uses
Frame, in the game of snooker
Frame, in the game of bowling
Frame, in the game of baseball
Frame (dance), either of two concepts in partner dancing
Frame (surname)
Frame, West Virginia, an unincorporated community, United States
Frame of government, a descriptive term synonymous with constitution
Frame of Government of Pennsylvania, the first colonial constitution of Pennsylvania, written by William Penn
Delegates to the 1787 United States Constitutional Convention, are sometimes called the "Framers," as they were framing a form of government
Frameup, to make an innocent party appear guilty of someone else's crime
French Regional & American Museums Exchange (FRAME), an alliance of French and American art museums
Frame (psychotherapy)
Dubai Frame, a building in Dubai, UAE

See also

Framework (disambiguation)
Framing (disambiguation)
X-frame (disambiguation)